FC Dinamo-Manas-SKIF Bishkek is a Kyrgyz professional football club based in Bishkek, that competed in the Kyrgyzstan League. The club plays its home games at Dynamo Stadion.

History 
1993: Founded as FC Shumkar-SKIF Bishkek.
1995: Renamed FC Shumkar Bishkek.
1996: Renamed FC Shumkar-Dastan Bishkek.
2000: Renamed FC Dinamo-Manas-SKIF Bishkek.
200?: Dissolved.

Current squad

External links 
Career stats by KLISF

Football clubs in Kyrgyzstan
Football clubs in Bishkek
1993 establishments in Kyrgyzstan